This article is a list of column-oriented database management system software.

Free and open-source software (FOSS)

Platform as a Service (PaaS) 
Amazon Redshift
 Microsoft Azure SQL Data Warehouse
 Google BigQuery
 Oracle Autonomous Datawarehouse Cloud Service
Snowflake Computing
MariaDB SkySQL
Actian Avalanche
Vertica Accelerator
CelerData

Proprietary
 Actuate Corporation BIRT Analytics ColumnarDB
 Dimensional Insight
 Endeca
 EXASOL
 EXtremeDB
 IBM Db2
 Infobright
 KDB
 kdb+
 memSQL
 Microsoft SQL Server
 Oracle Database (in-memory option)
 Oracle Exadata
SAND CDBMS
 SAP HANA
 SAP IQ
 SenSage
 SQream
 Teradata
 Vector, formerly Vectorwise
 Vertica (developed from open-source C-Store)
 Yellowbrick Data

References 

Column oriented
Database management systems column oriented